Hydnellum singeri is a tooth fungus in the family Bankeraceae. Found in Colombia, it was described as new to science in 1969 by Dutch mycologist Rudolph Arnold Maas Geesteranus. The specific epithet honors Rolf Singer.

References

External links

singeri
Inedible fungi
Fungi of Colombia
Fungi described in 1969